Naganuma Futopia Park is a park in Hasamachokitakata in Tome, Miyagi, Japan. The park is known for its Dutch windmill, which was built in 1991.

References

External links 
 Sako city area Naganuma footpia park, Tobe city
 Sightseeing information for Tobe city

Parks and gardens in Miyagi Prefecture